Redłowo is a coastal district of the Polish city of Gdynia. It is 2.96 km2 and has a population of 7,986 (as of 2022).

The Pomeranian Science and Technology Park Gdynia is located in Redłowo.

Redłowo has been mentioned as far back as the 12th and 13th centuries under the name Radłowo. It was a royal village of the Kingdom of Poland, administratively located in the Gdańsk County in the Pomeranian Voivodeship. It was recognized as Redłowo in 1888.

Transport
The Gdynia Redłowo railway station is located in Redłowo.

References

Districts of Gdynia
Populated coastal places in Poland